James Milton Black (19 August 1856 – 21 December 1938) was an American composer of hymns, choir leader and Sunday school teacher.

Black was born in South Hill, New York, but worked, lived and died in Williamsport, Pennsylvania. It is there that he worked at his Methodist Episcopal Church.

His first hymnal collections were:
Songs of the Soul (1894)
Songs of the Soul, Number Two (1896)

Some of his hymns include:

Come, Oh, Come to Me
The Day of All Days
We Shall Reign with Him in Glory
When The Roll Is Called Up Yonder

Some of hymn music with lyrics by others include:

A Home in My Heart for Jesus
I Remember Calvary
When the Saints are Marching In (1896)

The lyrics to When the Saints are Marching In are by Katharine Purvis. This song is not to be confused with "When The Saints Go Marching In," which was published afterwards in 1927 with similar words and music, certainly derivative.

References

The Book of World Famous Music, Classical, Popular and Folk by James Fuld (1966)

External links
  James Milton Black (1856-1938) Find A Grave memorial
  When The Roll Is Called Up Yonder YouTube video
 from Google Books 

1856 births
1938 deaths
American composers
American gospel singers
American male composers
Composers of Christian music
Musicians from Ithaca, New York
People from Williamsport, Pennsylvania